The Kurtis Sport Car (KSC) is a two-seat, aluminum-body sports car designed by Frank Kurtis and manufactured by Kurtis Kraft in 1949 and 1950. Built with numerous components (including the chassis and V8 engine) from a 1949 Ford, the KSC was built as both a production car and a kit car. It was sold at a base price of $3,495, and with options it could cost up to $5,000, which was approximately $1,000 more than the then-new Jaguar XK120.

After Frank Kurtis realized that the car was not sustainable financially, largely due to production costs, he sold the KSC's manufacturing rights, along with its blueprints, parts, and tooling, to Earl "Madman" Muntz for $200,000 in 1950. By that time, only 18 to 36 KSCs had been produced.

In September 1949, that same KSC was featured on the cover of the first issue of Motor Trend. The KSC also likely inspired Harley Earl's Project Opel at General Motors (GM), which ultimately created the production Chevrolet Corvette. The KSC was additionally described as the first "true American sports car" in the 2017 Pebble Beach Concours d'Elegance program.

Background 
In the 1920s, Frank Kurtis began his career in the automotive industry working alongside Harley Earl at Don Lee's Cadillac dealership in Los Angeles. By the late 1930s, he was building oval-track midget cars and championship cars for the Indianapolis 500. During the 1950s, Kurtis's company, Kurtis Kraft, would go on to build cars that would win five Indianapolis 500s. After building a Mercury-powered sports car just before World War II and similarly customizing a 1941 Buick in 1948, both of which generated serious interest and large offers from businessmen, Kraft decided to build what would become the Kurtis Sport Car (KSC). He envisioned it as a new type of sports car with American power, European handling, and modern styling.

Design 
The KSC was designed as a two-seat, aluminum-body sports car by Frank Kurtis. A two-door convertible, it had a front-engine, rear-wheel-drive layout. The prototype KSC was designed in 1949, and built on a 1949 Ford chassis. It was powered by a six-cylinder, supercharged Studebaker engine. The only instrument mounted on the prototype's dashboard was a tachometer, although the car also featured a telescoping steering wheel. Low-slung in appearance, the prototype was built with fiberglass body panels, removable plexiglass side windows, and a removable hardtop.

The KSC features a distinctive and sturdy front bumper and grille. It also boasts independent front suspension and semi-elliptic rear suspension. The production car was built with the chassis, V8 engine, suspension, and brakes from a 1949 Ford. The production KSC's body panels were mostly made of aluminum supported by a steel frame, although some of its panels were made from fiberglass or steel.

Production and sale 
In May 1949, Kurtis Kraft announced limited production of the KSC, with assembly occurring at its plant in Los Angeles. At the same time, it announced the KSC would also be available as a kit car.

The base price for the KSC in 1949 was $3,495, and with options it could cost up to $5,000. At the high end, it was approximately $1,000 more expensive than the then-new Jaguar XK120.

During 1949, Kurtis had only sold about 15 to 20 KSCs, by which point he realized that the car was not sustainable financially. In 1950, he sold the KSC's manufacturing rights, along with its blueprints, parts, and tooling, to Earl "Madman" Muntz for $200,000. By the time of the sale, only 18 to 36 KSCs had been produced. Production costs were ultimately the demise of the car.

Performance 

Legacy 
In September 1949, the KSC that was driven by Wally Parks at Bonneville was featured on the cover of the first issue of Motor Trend. Publisher Robert E. "Pete" Petersen, who was partially inspired by Frank Kurtis to start the magazine, may have chosen the KSC for the first cover of Motor Trend in part due to his relationship with Kurtis. That car, the first production KSC and the third built overall (serial number KB003), was purchased by Motor Trend in 2019 and put on display at its headquarters in El Segundo, California.

After buying the rights to the KSC in 1950, "Madman" Muntz proceeded to create the Muntz Car Company and redevelop the car into what eventually became the Muntz Jet. He lost money on the endeavor and ceased production in 1954.

By 1951, just two years after the KSC appeared on the cover of Motor Trend, Harley Earl had created a secret program at General Motors (GM) known as Project Opel. Its goal was to create a fiberglass-bodied car using production components, similar to what Kraft had attempted with the KSC. First unveiled at Motorama in 1953 as the EX-122, the resulting GM car eventually entered production as the Chevrolet Corvette.

A 1949 KSC won the Motor Trend Classic Award – Editor's Choice at the 2010 Amelia Island Concours d'Elegance, while a different 1949 KSC won Best in Class for Kurtis street vehicles at the 2011 Amelia Island Concours d'Elegance. The 2017 Pebble Beach Concours d'Elegance program described the KSC as the first "true American sports car". At the 2019 Amelia Island Concours d'Elegance auction, a 1950 KSC sold for $263,200.

References

Sources

External links 

Sports cars
Cars introduced in 1949
Rear-wheel-drive vehicles
Convertibles